1995 was a common year in the Gregorian calendar.

1995 may also refer to:
 1995 (number)
 1995 (band), a French rap band
 1995 (Screaming Headless Torsos album)
 1995, a 2016 song by Sakura Fujiwara
 Delete Yourself!, a 1995 album by Atari Teenage Riot, originally released as 1995